Girls I Have Known is an album recorded by Jim Reeves and released in 1958 on the RCA Victor label (catalog no. LPM-1576). The album was produced by Chet Atkins. The cover photograph was by Ben Somoroff.

On November 17, 1958, it was rated No. 2 on Billboard magazine's "Favorite C&W Albums" based on the magazine's annual poll of country and western disc jockeys.

AllMusic gave the album four stars, and critic Bruce Eder wrote: "Whether it's pop or country, it's all delightful, and of immense importance in the history of country music -- this was one of the very first countrypolitan recordings, utilizing a sophisticated sound that was closer to pop music than to anything previously identified as country music."

Track listing
Side A
 "Marie" (Irving Berlin)
 "Mona Lisa" (Livingston, Evans)
 "My Juanita" (Caroline Norton)
 "Charmaine" (Rapee, Pollack)
 "Margie" (Davis, Conrad, Robinson)
 "Anna Marie" (Cindy Walker)

Side B
 "Sweet Sue, Just  You" (Victor Young, Will J. Harris)
 "Linda" (J. Lawrence)
 "Ramona" (M. Wayne, L.W. Gilbert)
 "Maria Elena" (L. Barcelata)
 "My Mary" (Jimmy Davis, Stuart Hamblen)
 "Good Night Irene" (Leadbelly)

See also
 Jim Reeves discography

References

1958 albums
Jim Reeves albums